Events from the year 2008 in Taiwan, Republic of China. This year is numbered Minguo 97 according to the official Republic of China calendar.

Incumbents
 President – Chen Shui-bian, Ma Ying-jeou
 Vice President – Annette Lu, Vincent Siew
 Premier – Chang Chun-hsiung, Liu Chao-shiuan
 Vice Premier – Chiou I-jen, Chang Chun-hsiung, Paul Chiu

Events

January
 12 January – 2008 Republic of China transitional justice referendums.
 16 January – The promulgation of Partial Article Revision on Petroleum Administration Act.

February
 1 February – The renaming of National College of Physical Education and Sports to National Taiwan Sport University.

March
 9 March – The launching of the first line (Red Line) of Kaohsiung Mass Rapid Transit in Kaohsiung.
 22 March – Ma Ying-jeou is elected President of the Republic of China with more than 58% of the votes in the 2008 presidential election, handing the presidency back to the Kuomintang (KMT) after eight years under the Democratic Progressive Party.
 22 March – 2008 Taiwanese United Nations membership referendum.

May
 18 May – 2008 Democratic Progressive Party chairmanship election.

June
 23–27 June – Computer-simulated war gaming of Han Kuang Exercise.

July
 1 July – The opening of Taipei Medical University Shuang-Ho Hospital in Zhonghe Township, Taipei County.
 4 July – The first direct China-Taiwan flights begin in nearly 6 decades.
 26 July – The closing of Chinese Culture and Movie Center in Taipei.

August
 18 August – The opening of Museum of Jade Art in Zhongshan District, Taipei.

September
 14 September – The launching of the second line of Kaohsiung Mass Rapid Transit in Kaohsiung City.
 22–26 September – Field training exercises of Han Kuang Exercise.

October
 7 October – The opening of Evergreen Maritime Museum in Zhongzheng District, Taipei.
 9–12 October – The 3rd Taiwan Youth Day.
 25 October – The 1025 rally to safeguard Taiwan is held in Taipei by the opposition Democratic Progressive Party to voice dissatisfaction with Taiwan's increasingly closer ties with Beijing.

November
 3–7 November – Second Chen-Chiang summit, the first visit of Association for Relations Across the Taiwan Straits head to Taiwan.
 22–23 November – Lien Chen meets PRC President Hu Jintao at the APEC Peru 2008 in Peru, the highest level of official exchange between the Mainland and Taiwan on the international stage.
 24 November – The establishment of Fangyuan Museum of Arts in Jiangjun Township, Tainan County.

December
 15 December – Full restoration of Three Links with Mainland China.

Deaths
 14 January – Wu Jin, 74, Taiwanese Minister for Education (1996–1998), cancer.
 29 April – Bo Yang, 88, Taiwanese writer.
 10 May – Liao Feng-teh, 57, Taiwanese incoming interior minister, heart attack.
 14 June – Chu Fu-Sung, 93, Taiwanese foreign minister (1979–1987).
 4 July – Wayne Pai, 55, Taiwanese businessman, founding chairman of Polaris Group, suicide.
 12 July – Tsai Chao-yang, 67, Taiwanese politician, minister of Transportation and Communications, pneumonia.
 9 August – Vivian Shun-wen Wu, 95, Taiwanese entrepreneur, chairwoman of Yulon Motor, heart failure.
 20 August – Chao Yao-dong, 92, Taiwanese minister of economic affairs, multiple organ dysfunction syndrome.
 15 October – Wang Yung-ching, 91, Taiwanese entrepreneur and billionaire, founder of Formosa Plastics.
 28 October – Kung Te-cheng, 88, Chinese-born Taiwanese 77th generation descendant of Confucius, heart and respiratory failure.
 11 December – Yeh Shih-tao, 83, Taiwanese writer, colorectal cancer.

References

 
Years of the 21st century in Taiwan